The 2000 SportsRacing WORLD CUP was the second season of SportsRacing World Cup, an auto racing series organized by the International Racing Series Ltd. and officially sanctioned by the Fédération Internationale de l'Automobile. The series is a continuation of the former International Sports Racing Series which began in 1997. It was open to two categories of sports prototypes, SR and SRL, and awarded driver and team championships in each class.  It began on 26 March 2000 and ended on 26 November 2000 after ten events were held in Europe, the United States of America, and South Africa.

Christian Pescatori and David Terrien won the SR drivers' championship, while their JMB Giesse Team Ferrari squad won the teams' title for the third consecutive year. For the SRL category Redman Bright and drivers Peter Owen and Mark Smithson were the respective champions.

Schedule

Much of the calendar for 2000 calendar was a direct carryover of the 1999 calendar, with the notable exception of two races in the United States.  As part of an agreement between Grand-Am and IRS Ltd., cars from the World Cup could participate in two Grand-Am Road Racing Championship events, while Grand-Am would include two World Cup events on their schedule.  However, after the initial announcement in 1999 Grand-Am opted instead to not include the European rounds in their championship as the majority of teams were not interested.  World Cup teams also withdrew their support, eventually leading to the two races only counting toward the SRL category championship.  The two American races replaced the former event at Pergusa.

Races were of a duration of two hours and 30 minutes, with exception of the Monza race which covered 500 km and the American events which were 500 and 250 miles in respective distance.

Entries

SR

SRL

Results and standings

Race results
For the American rounds only World Cup entries were considered for championship points, meaning the winner listed is the highest-finishing World Cup entry.

Points were awarded to the top eight finishers in each category.  Entries were required to complete 60% of the race distance in order to be classified as a finisher and earn points.  Drivers were required to complete 20% of the total race distance for their car to earn points.  Teams scored points for only their highest finishing entry.

Driver championships

SR

Team championships
Only the highest placing car within a team earned points towards the championship.

SR

SRL

External links
 2000 Sports Racing World Cup results

Sports Racing World Cup
FIA Sportscar Championship